The Jens Otto Christiansen House, also known as Bedstemor's (Grandmother's) House, is a historic residence located in Elk Horn, Iowa, United States. It was listed on the National Register of Historic Places in 1997.  The historic importance of the house is its association with Danish immigration into Shelby and Audubon counties from 1865 to 1924.  This is the largest area of Danish rural settlement in the United States.  Construction of the 1½-story, frame house is attributed to Jens Otto Christiansen, who immigrated to the United States in 1889 and worked as a carpenter.  It follows a basic foursquare plan with Queen Anne-style embellishments that include triangular gabled wall dormers, decorative sunburst woodwork, and decorative shingle siding.

References

Houses completed in 1908
Houses in Shelby County, Iowa
Queen Anne architecture in Iowa
National Register of Historic Places in Shelby County, Iowa
Houses on the National Register of Historic Places in Iowa
1908 establishments in Iowa